Mazhar Ali Qadri commonly known as M A Qadri. was a Bangladesh Awami League politician. He was elected a member of parliament from Pabna-5 in 2000 By-election.

Career 
Mazhar Ali Qadri was the first vice chancellor of Bangabandhu Sheikh Mujib Medical University. He was the founding president of Swadhinata Chikitshak Parishad, a pro-AL organisation of doctors. Qadri was elected to parliament from Pabna-5 as a Bangladesh Awami League candidate in 2000 By-election.

References 

Living people
People from Pabna District
Awami League politicians
7th Jatiya Sangsad members
Year of birth missing (living people)
Bangladesh Krishak Sramik Awami League central committee members